The Hugo Gallery was a New York City gallery, founded by Robert Rothschild, Elizabeth Arden and Maria dei Principi Ruspoli Hugo between 1945 and 1955 and operated by Alexander Iolas.
The Hugo gallery was initially on East 55th Street and Madison Avenue.

When it first opened – on Thursday, November 15, 1945 – an extravagant party was held on the premises; an article by Edward Alden Jewell in the next morning’s Times reported on everything from the “first-rate” paintings to the sumptuous decorations, the work, he surmised, of “most of the florists in town”. The entire dance world, or so it seemed, turned out for the reception, surely less for the chance to contemplate paintings by Chagall and de Chirico than for an up-close view of Pavel Tchelitchew and Tamara Toumanova.

Exhibitions

The gallery’s inaugural exhibition in November 1945, entitled “The Fantastic in Modern Art”, was organized by Charles Henri Ford and Parker Tyler, the editors of Surrealist magazine View.

The Christmas show of 1945 called “The Poetic Theatre” included among others Salvador Dalí, Pavel Tchelitchew and Joseph Cornell.
In December 1946, Joseph Cornell had a solo exhibitions at the Hugo Gallery named "Romantic Museum at the Hugo Gallery: Portraits of Women by Joseph Cornell". For this exhibition Cornell conceived one of his most ambitious works, the untitled piece known as "Penny Arcade Portrait of Lauren Bacall".

In 1947 the gallery hosted "Bloodflames 1947", a show organized by Nicolas Calas and designed by Frederick Kiesler which was the last collective manifestation of the surrealist exiles' group in New York. The exhibition included work by David Hare, Arshile Gorky, Roberto Matta and Isamu Noguchi.

In April 1947, René Magritte had an exhibition at the Hugo Gallery in New York. Magritte achieves international recognition, in large part, to Hugo Gallery.

In 1952, Andy Warhol had his first solo exhibition at the Hugo Gallery named "Fifteen Drawings Based on the Writings of Truman Capote" (June 16 – July 3, 1952).

In 1953, Jan Yoors, the Belgian-born artist working in tapestry, painting, sculpture, and photography, had one of his first New York solo exhibitions at the gallery.

The director of the gallery was Alexander Iolas, assisted by David Mann.
Alexander Iolas after working at the Hugo Gallery, founded the Jackson-Iolas Gallery in 1955 with former dancer, Brooks Jackson and later created a network of galleries under his own name. 
David Mann after working at the Hugo Gallery became the director of Bodley Gallery.

References

Sources
 Andy Warhol and Hugo Gallery
 René Magritte and Hugo Gallery
 Smithsonian Archives of American Art - interview with Brooks Jackson, dealer
 Utopia Parkway: The Life And Work Of Joseph Cornell

Contemporary art galleries in the United States
American contemporary art
Defunct art museums and galleries in Manhattan
Art galleries established in 1945
Art galleries disestablished in 1955
1945 establishments in New York City
1955 disestablishments in New York (state)